Robert Woods Bliss (August 5, 1875 – April 19, 1962) was an American diplomat, art collector, philanthropist, and one of the co-founders of the Dumbarton Oaks Research Library and Collection in Washington, D.C.

Early life
Bliss was born in St. Louis, Missouri on August 5, 1875, the son of William Henry Bliss (1844–1932), a United States Attorney, and Anna Louisa Woods Bliss (1850-1888), and the brother of Annie Louise Bliss Warren (1878–1964). 

When his father remarried in 1894, he became the stepson of Anna Dorinda Blaksley Barnes Bliss (1851–1935) and the stepbrother of Cora Fanny Barnes (1858–1911) and Mildred Barnes (1879–1969). 

He attended J.P. Hopkinson's Private School in Boston in 1894 and 1895, and received his A.B. in 1900 from Harvard College, where he was a member of the Owl Club. Bliss married Mildred in 1908.

Diplomatic career
After graduating from college, Bliss went to work in Puerto Rico, first in the office of the secretary of the U.S. civil government there, then as private secretary to the governor of Puerto Rico (1901–1903). He passed the State Department qualifying examination in 1903 and entered diplomatic Foreign Service. 

As a career diplomat and Republican, Bliss served as U.S. consul in Venice (1903); second secretary to the U.S. embassy in St. Petersburg (1904–1907); secretary of the legation in Brussels (1907–1909); secretary of the legation in Buenos Aires (1909–1912); secretary of the United States embassy in Paris (1912–1916); and counselor of the embassy in Paris (1916–1919).

In 1908, he was a delegate to the international conference to consider revision of the arms and ammunition regulations of the Brussels Conference Act of 1890, and in 1918 he was temporarily assigned to serve as chargé d'affaires at the U.S. legation in The Hague.

Robert Bliss and his wife, Mildred, were living in Paris when World War I broke out. They helped found the American Field Ambulance Service (later the American Field Service) in France in 1914, to which they donated an entire section of 23 ambulances and three staff cars. They also opened and equipped a central depot in Paris, the "Service de Distribution Américaine," for the distribution of medical and surgical supplies and clothing. The Blisses' social circle in Paris included Edith Wharton, Walter Gay, and Royall Tyler.

In 1920, Bliss became chief of the Division of Western European Affairs at the State Department in Washington, and was Third Assistant Secretary of State (1921–1923) before becoming U.S. Envoy to Sweden (1923–1927) and U.S. Ambassador to Argentina (1927–1933), after which he retired from the Foreign Service.

War service

Bliss returned to the State Department following the entry of the U.S. into World War II, as a consultant (1942–1943), special assistant to U.S. Secretary of State Cordell Hull (1944), and consultant to Secretary of State Edward Stettinius (1944–1945). Robert Bliss was instrumental in arranging for a series of important diplomatic meetings to take place at Dumbarton Oaks (see below) in the late summer and early fall of 1944. 

Known as the Dumbarton Oaks Conference, these meetings hosted delegations from China, the Soviet Union, the United Kingdom, and the United States. The delegates deliberated over proposals for the establishment of an organization to maintain peace and security in the world, and their outcome was the United Nations Charter that was adopted in San Francisco in 1945. Bliss retired a second time from government work in November 1945.

Art collecting and Dumbarton Oaks

While living in Paris (1912–1919), the Blisses had become reacquainted with Mildred Bliss's childhood friend, the American historian and art connoisseur Royall Tyler. Tyler introduced the Blisses to important Parisian art dealers and nurtured their growing interest as art collectors, especially of Byzantine and pre-Columbian artworks. Robert Bliss was particularly enamored of pre-Columbian art, stating that when Tyler introduced him to it in a Parisian shop in 1912, "the collector's microbe took root in ... very fertile soil."

In 1920 the Blisses purchased their home, Dumbarton Oaks. They set about renovating and enlarging the house, adding to the grounds, and building a series of terraced gardens on the 54-acre estate. The Blisses lived abroad (1923–1933) for many of the years in which this work was carried out, though they continued to supervise it closely. They also continued to build their art collection, and upon retiring in 1933 to Dumbarton Oaks they began to lay the groundwork for a museum and research institute. In 1935, Robert Bliss traveled through the highlands and tropics of Mexico, Guatemala, and Honduras to see Maya ruins with Frederic C. Walcott (1869–1949), a trustee of the Carnegie Institution of Washington. In 1940, the Blisses cofounded the Dumbarton Oaks Research Library and Collection, which they endowed and gave to Harvard University. After giving Dumbarton Oaks to Harvard, the Blisses resided at 1537 28th Street, N.W., Washington, D.C. Robert Bliss's collection of pre-Columbian art, which had been exhibited at the National Gallery of Art in Washington, D.C. between 1947 and 1962, was installed in 1963 at Dumbarton Oaks in a new wing designed by Philip Johnson.

Later life
Robert Bliss was involved with many cultural and civic organizations. He served as honorary president and trustee of the American Federation of Arts; president of the American Foreign Service Association; vice-chairman of the Smithsonian Art Commission; vice-chairman of the board of the National Trust for Historic Preservation; director and first vice-president of the Washington Criminal Justice Association; member of the American Academy of Political and Social Science; and member of the Harvard Board of Overseers. He was trustee of the American Museum of Natural History, New York; trustee and executive committee member of the Carnegie Institution, Washington, D.C.; trustee of Nelson Rockefeller's Museum of Primitive Art, New York; trustee of the Santa Barbara Museum of Art; and member of the Advisory Committee on Art of the State Department's Division of Cultural Relations and the Office of the Coordinator of Inter-American Affairs. He received honorary Doctor of Law degrees from the University of Missouri (1933); Syracuse University (1934); and Harvard University (1951). Robert Bliss was one of five retired diplomats who co-signed a 1954 letter protesting U.S. Senator Joseph McCarthy's attacks on the Foreign Service.

The Blisses had no children. Robert Woods Bliss died at the age of 86 in Washington, D.C. on April 19, 1962.

Publications
He wrote Indigenous Art of the Americas (1947; reissued as Pre-Columbian Art in 1957).

Notes

External links

 Dumbarton Oaks
 Robert Woods Bliss from Bliss Family History Society

1875 births
1962 deaths
Ambassadors of the United States to Argentina
Ambassadors of the United States to Sweden
American art collectors
American philanthropists
Harvard College alumni
Mesoamerican art collectors
Missouri Republicans
Museum founders
People from St. Louis
People from Washington, D.C.
United States Foreign Service personnel
Washington, D.C., Republicans
20th-century American diplomats